Mexico competed at the 1948 Summer Olympics in London, England. 88 competitors, 81 men and 7 women, took part in 57 events in 14 sports.

Medalists

Athletics

Track & road events

Field events

Basketball

Summary

Team roster

Group play

Quarterfinals

Semifinals

Bronze medal game

Boxing

Cycling

Road

Track

Sprint

Diving

Men

Women

Equestrian

Dressage

Eventing

Jumping

Fencing

Men

Women

Football

Summary

Team roster

Head coach: Abel Ramírez

Round of 16

Gymnastics

Artistic

Team

Individual
Apparatus and all-around events received separate scores.

Modern pentathlon

Shooting

Swimming

Men

Women

Weightlifting

Wrestling

Freestyle

Wrestlers who accumulated 5 "bad points" were eliminated. Points were given as follows: 1 point for victories short of a fall and 3 points for every loss.

References

External links
Official Olympic Reports
International Olympic Committee results database

Nations at the 1948 Summer Olympics
1948
1948 in Mexican sports